Lord Carlisle may refer to:

 Mark Carlisle, Baron Carlisle of Bucklow
 Earl of Carlisle, a title that has been created three times in the Peerage of England

See also
 Alex Carlile, Baron Carlile of Berriew